The Call of Her People is a 1917 silent film spectacle directed by John W. Noble and starring Ethel Barrymore. It was produced and distributed by Metro Pictures. The story is based on a play by Edward Sheldon.

Cast
Ethel Barrymore - Egypt
Robert Whittier - Young Faro
William B. Davidson - Nicholas Van Kleet
Frank Montgomery - Faro Black
William Mandeville - Gordon Lindsay
Mrs. Allen Walker - Mother Komello (*as Mrs. Allan Walker)
Helen Arnold - Mary Van Kleet
Hugh Jeffrey - Sheriff

Preservation status
The film is preserved by George Eastman House Motion Picture Collection.

See also
Ethel Barrymore on stage, screen and radio

References

External links

lantern slide(Wayback Machine)
lantern slide

1917 films
American silent feature films
Films directed by John W. Noble
American films based on plays
Films based on works by Edward Sheldon
American black-and-white films
Metro Pictures films
1910s American films